Hithey Dheymee is a 2011 Maldivian drama film directed by Amjad Ibrahim. Produced by Hussain Ibrahim, Ali Ibrahim and Amjad Ibrahim under Farivaa Films, the film stars Amira Ismail, Hussain Solah, Ali Ahmed, Fathimath Azifa and Aminath Shareef in pivotal roles. The film was released on 20 April 2011.

Premise
Nadheema, a school teacher marries the only son from a wealthy family, Hisham (Hussain Solah) despite his mother's disapproval since Nadheema is from a middle class family. Upon discovering their relationship, Ahmed (Ali Ahmed), the best friend of Hisham and who is secretly in love with Nadheema is heartbroken. When Nadheema gets pregnant, they bring a maid, Shifa (Fathimath Azifa) to help them with their responsibilities. Complications arise when his mother plots against Nadheema and Hisham has a secret affair with Shifa.

Cast 
 Amira Ismail as Nadheema
 Hussain Solah as Hisham
 Ali Ahmed as Ahmed
 Fathimath Azifa as Shifa
 Aminath Shareef as Fareedha
 Ali Shameel as Shameel
 Fauziyya Hassan as Shakeela
 Nadhiya Hassan as Shaza
 Mariyam Shahuzaa as Fazeena
 Nashidha Mohamed as Rish

Soundtrack

References

2011 films
Maldivian drama films
Films directed by Amjad Ibrahim
2011 drama films
Dhivehi-language films